Rafael de La-Hoz Castanys (born 1955) is a Spanish architect.

Son and grandson of architects (his father was ), he was born in 1955 in Córdoba, where he was raised until he was 17 years old. He earned a degree in architecture from the Higher Technical School of Architecture of Madrid (ETSAM). In 2000, he became the director of the architecture firm founded by his grandfather back in 1920.

He is known as the author of many projects of corporative headquarters in Spain, including Repsol, Garrigues, BMW, Ferrovial, Uría y Menéndez, Endesa, Telefónica.

He is a visiting scholar at the Universidad Camilo José Cela and the Catalonia's International University.

Projects 

 Repsol Campus (Arganzuela, Madrid, Spain)
 Distrito Telefónica (Las Tablas, Madrid, Spain)
 Endesa's headquarters (Campo de las Naciones, Madrid, Spain)
 Torres de Hércules (Los Barrios, Spain)
 Hospital Universitario Rey Juan Carlos (Móstoles, Spain)
  (Madrid, Spain)
 Junta de Distrito de Retiro (Madrid, Spain)
 Headquarters of the Higher Council of Chambers of Commerce (Madrid, Spain)
 Auditorio Rafael del Pino (Madrid, Spain)
Mohammed VI Tower (Morocco)

References 

1955 births
Living people
Spanish architects
21st-century Spanish architects